The Women's Australian Open 2012 is the women' edition of the 2012 Australian Open, which is a tournament of the WSA World Tour event Gold (Prize money: $50,000). The event took place in Canberra in Australia from 13 to 18 August. Nicol David won her second Australian Open trophy, beating Laura Massaro in the final.

Prize money and ranking points
For 2012, the prize purse was $50,000. The prize money and points breakdown is as follows:

Seeds

Draw and results

See also
WSA World Tour 2012
Australian Open (squash)
2012 Men's Australian Open (squash)

References

External links
WSA Australian Open 2012 website
Australian Open official website

Squash tournaments in Australia
Squash
2012 in women's squash